Stockport North was a borough constituency which returned one Member of Parliament (MP) to the House of Commons of the Parliament of the United Kingdom from 1950 until 1983.

History
Under the Representation of the People Act 1948, which came into effect for the 1950 general election, the two-member parliamentary borough of Stockport was abolished and replaced by the single-member borough constituencies of Stockport North and Stockport South.

Further to the Third Periodic Review of Westminster constituencies, which followed the local government reorganisation implemented on 1 April 1974, the constituency was abolished for the 1983 general election, with 60% of the electorate going to the new single-member Stockport constituency, and 40% going to form part of the new Denton and Reddish constituency.

Boundaries
1950–1974: The County Borough of Stockport wards of Edgeley, Heaton Lane, Heaton Norris North, Heaton Norris South, Hollywood, Lancashire Hill, Old Road, Reddish North, and Reddish South.

1974–1983: The County Borough of Stockport wards of Cheadle Heath, Edgeley, Heaton Chapel, Heaton Mersey, Heaton Moor, Heaton Norris, Lancashire Hill, Longford, and Reddish Green.

Boundaries adjusted to take account of revision of local authority wards

From 1 April 1974 until the constituency was abolished for the 1983 general election, the constituency comprised parts of the metropolitan borough of Stockport in Greater Manchester, but its boundaries were unchanged.

On abolition, the majority of the constituency was re-combined with the majority of Stockport South to form the re-established constituency of Stockport. Northern-most parts, comprising the town of Reddish, were included in the new constituency of Denton and Reddish.

Members of Parliament
Always a fairly marginal seat, the constituency changed hands at the 1964, 1970 and February 1974 general elections.

Election results

Elections in the 1950s

Elections in the 1960s

Elections in the 1970s

See also

 History of parliamentary constituencies and boundaries in Cheshire

References

Times Guides to the House of Commons

Parliamentary constituencies in North West England (historic)
Constituencies of the Parliament of the United Kingdom established in 1950
Constituencies of the Parliament of the United Kingdom disestablished in 1983
Politics of the Metropolitan Borough of Stockport